
Year 343 BC was a year of the pre-Julian Roman calendar. At the time it was known as the Year of the Consulship of Corvus and Arvina (or, less frequently, year 411 Ab urbe condita). The denomination 343 BC for this year has been used since the early medieval period, when the Anno Domini calendar era became the prevalent method in Europe for naming years.

Events 
 By place 
 Persian Empire 
 The King of Persia, Artaxerxes III, personally leads the Persian forces invading Egypt. The Persians are keen to access Egypt's gold and corn supplies. The town of Pelusium in the Nile Delta puts up resistance, but Pharaoh Nectanebo II is forced to retreat to Memphis. As the situation deteriorates, Nectanebo II leaves for exile in Nubia. His departure marks the end of the 30th Dynasty, the last native house to rule Egypt.
 With Nectanebo II's flight, all organised resistance to the Persians collapses, and Egypt is once again reduced to a satrapy of the Persian Empire. A Persian satrap is put in place in Egypt. The walls of the country's cities are destroyed and its temples are plundered. Artaxerxes and his commander-in-chief, General Bagoas, leave Egypt loaded with treasure.

 Greece 
 The Athenian statesman Demosthenes has Aeschines indicted for treason. However, Aeschines drags up the inappropriate past of one of Demosthenes' associates, Timarchus and is acquitted by a narrow margin.
 King Philip II of Macedon again marches against Cersobleptes, King of Thrace, defeats him in several battles, and reduces him to the condition of being a tributary.
 Phalaikos unsuccessfully lays siege to Kydonia on the island of Crete.

 Italy 
 The native Italian tribes, the Lucanians and Bruttians, press down upon the Greek colonies of Magna Graecia, including Tarentum. Responding to calls for help from these former Greek colonies, King Archidamus III of Sparta sets sail with a band of mercenaries for Italy.
 After his surrender to the Corinthian general Timoleon, who takes over as ruler of Syracuse, the former tyrant, Dionysius II, is allowed to retire to Corinth to live in exile, although he dies within the year. The Syracusan constitution is changed by Timoleon with the new constitution designed to have safeguards against tyranny. Timoleon invites new settlers from Greece to come to Sicily.

 Roman Republic 
 The most powerful group of the native tribes in highland Italy, the confederated Samnites, swarm down into Campania. The citizens of the city of Capua appeal to Rome for help in settling their internal quarrels and to save their city from destruction from the Samnites. The Romans respond, which begins the First Samnite War.

Births 
 Philetaerus, founder of the Attalid dynasty of Pergamum in Anatolia (approximate date) (d. 263 BC)

Deaths 
 Dionysius II, tyrant of Syracuse (b. c. 397 BC)

References